Dongfeng is the romanization of several Chinese names of which most notably "East Wind"; it may refer to:

People's Republic of China

 Dongfeng (missile), series of ballistic missiles of the People's Liberation Army
 Chinese series of diesel locomotives
 China Railways DF
DF4
DF8
Dongfeng DMU
 Dongfeng Motor Corporation, automobile company and its subsidiaries and joint ventures
 Dongfeng County, Jilin
 Dongfeng District, Jiamusi, Heilongjiang
 Dongfeng Town (disambiguation), for towns named Dongfeng
Subdistricts
 Dongfeng Subdistrict, Bengbu, in Longzihu District, Bengbu, Anhui
 Dongfeng Subdistrict, Beijing, in Fangshan District
 Dongfeng Subdistrict, Guangzhou, in Yuexiu District
 Dongfeng Subdistrict, Baoding, in Beishi District, Baoding, Hebei
 Dongfeng Subdistrict, Shijiazhuang, in Qiaodong District
 Dongfeng Subdistrict, Daqing, in Sartu District, Daqing, Heilongjiang
 Dongfeng Subdistrict, Jixi, in Jiguan District, Jixi, Heilongjiang
 Dongfeng Subdistrict, Qitaihe, in Qiezihe District, Qitaihe, Heilongjiang
 Dongfeng Subdistrict, Shangqiu, in Liangyuan District, Shangqiu, Henan
 Dongfeng Subdistrict, Zhumadian, in Yicheng District, Zhumadian, Henan
 Dongfeng Subdistrict, Xiangyang, in Fancheng District, Xiangyang, Hubei
 Dongfeng Subdistrict, Changchun, in Luyuan District, Changchun, Jilin
 Dongfeng Subdistrict, Benxi, in Xihu District, Benxi, Liaoning
 Dongfeng Subdistrict, Panjin, in Shuangtaizi District, Panjin, Liaoning
 Dongfeng Subdistrict, Yingkou, in Zhanqian District, Yingkou, Liaoning
 Dongfeng Subdistrict, Jinan, in Licheng District
Townships
 Dongfeng Township, Shanxi, in Yangcheng County
Written as :
 Dongfeng Township, Beijing
 Dongfeng Township, Anyang, in Long'an District, Anyang, Henan
 Dongfeng Township, Dancheng County, Henan
 Dongfeng Township, Zhuzhou, in Yanling County, Hunan
 Dongfeng Township, Yizhang County, Hunan
 Dongfeng Township, Jilin, in Taobei District, Baicheng
Village
 Dongfeng, a village in Xinghua Township, Hong'an County, Huanggang, Hubei

Taiwan 
 Azio TV, satellite capable operated by Era Television

People 
 Dong Feng (physician), Eastern Han physician
 Dong Feng (weightlifter), Chinese weightlifter

See also
 Dongfang (disambiguation)